Chittagong Division, officially known as Chattogram Division, is geographically the largest of the eight administrative divisions of Bangladesh. The administrative division includes mainland Chittagong District, neighbouring districts and the Chittagong Hill Tracts.

Chittagong Division is home to Cox's Bazar, the longest natural sea beach in the world; as well as St. Martin's Island, Bangladesh's sole coral reef.

History
The Chittagong Division was established in 1829 to serve as an administrative headquarters for five of Bengal's easternmost districts, with the Chittagong District serving as its headquarters. During the East Pakistan period, the division's Tippera district was renamed to Comilla District in 1960.

In 1984, fifteen districts were created by separating and reducing the original five districts of Chittagong, Comilla, Hill Tracts, Noakhali and Sylhet:
The Chittagong District was divided into two districts; Chittagong and Cox's Bazar District
The Cumilla District was split into three districts; Cumilla, Brahmanbaria and Chandpur
The Hill Tracts District was split into three districts; Bandarban, Khagrachhari and Rangamati
The Noakhali District was divided into three districts; Noakhali, Lakshmipur and Feni
The Sylhet District was split into four districts; Sylhet, Habiganj, Moulvibazar and Sunamganj.

Sylhet, Habiganj, Moulvibazar and Sunamganj district ceded from the Chittagong Division to join a newly-established Sylhet Division in 1995.

Administration
Chattogram Division is presently subdivided into eleven districts (zilas) and thence into 99 sub-districts (upazilas). The first six districts listed below comprise the north-western portion (37.6%) of the division, while the remaining five comprise the south-eastern portion (62.4%), the two portions being separated by the lower (or Bangladeshi) stretch of the Feni River; the upland districts of Khagrachhari, Rangamati and Bandarban together comprise that area previously known as the Chittagong Hill Tracts.

Demographics 

At the time of the 2022 census, the division had a population of 33,202,326. 90.11% were Muslims, 6.61% Hindus, 2.92% Buddhists, 0.22% Christians and 0.14% Animism.

See also 
Divisions of Bangladesh

Sources 
Census figures for 1991, 2001 and 2011 are from Bangladesh Bureau of Statistics, Population Census Wing. The 2011 Census figures are based on preliminary results.

References

External links

 Government of Chittagong Division website

 
Divisions of Bangladesh
Divisions of British India
Eastern Bengal